Jakub Škarek (born 10 November 1999) is a Czech professional ice hockey goaltender currently playing with the Bridgeport Islanders in the American Hockey League (AHL) as a prospect to the New York Islanders of the National Hockey League (NHL). He was selected 72nd overall by the Islanders in the 2018 NHL Entry Draft.

Background 
Škarek was born into a family of athletes, with his mother, Eva, competing in basketball and high jump, his father, Josef, competing in football, volleyball, triathlons, and mountain climbing, and his sister, Tereza, throwing javelin. In addition to his native Czech, Škarek can speak English, as well as some Russian, Slovak, Swedish, and Finnish.

Playing career
Škarek originally began his playing career as a forward, however, he switched to goaltender when he was 10 years old because his team's goalie missed a practice and the team needed a replacement.

Škarek made his professional debut with his youth club, Dukla Jihlava, before making his Czech Extraliga debut on loan with Sparta Praha during the 2016–17 season as an 18-year old.

Returning to Dukla Jihlava after backstopping the club to promotion to the Czech Extraliga for the 2017–18 season, Škarek made 21 top flight appearances in posting a .913 save percentage.

In order to continue his development, he left Dukla Jihlava for a higher level of competition, joining the Lahti Pelicans of the Finnish Liiga for the 2018–19 season on 2 May 2018.

Škarek's potential was noticed and he was selected in the third round, 72nd overall, by the New York Islanders in the 2018 NHL Entry Draft. On 4 July 2018, Škarek was signed to a three-year, entry-level contract by the Islanders, with the agreement to continue his contract with the Lahti Pelicans. 

On 16 November 2020, the Islanders loaned Škarek to Peliitat Heinola of Finnish Mestis until the commencement of the training camp for the pandemic delayed 2020–21 season.

References

External links
 

1999 births
Living people
Bridgeport Islanders players
Bridgeport Sound Tigers players
Czech ice hockey goaltenders
HC Dukla Jihlava players
Lahti Pelicans players
New York Islanders draft picks
Peliitat Heinola players
HC Sparta Praha players
Sportspeople from Jihlava
Worcester Railers players
Czech expatriate ice hockey players in the United States
Czech expatriate ice hockey players in Finland